Batards Sensibles is the second studio album by French hip hop group TTC. It was released on Big Dada in 2004.

Critical reception 
Joshua Glazer of AllMusic said: "Dense analog synths and rugged 808 beats reference the good-times party vibe of '80s rap, although many of these tracks are digitally fractured to give things an updated feel." Meanwhile, Peter Macia of Pitchfork gave the album an 8.0 out of 10, saying: "Teki [Latex], Tido [Berman], and Cuizinier are as captivating and entertaining as any, despite the language barrier."

Track listing

Charts

References

External links 
 

2004 albums
Big Dada albums
TTC (band) albums